Ezra Butler Eddy (August 22, 1827 – February 10, 1906) was a Canadian businessman and political figure. Born in Vermont, Eddy moved to Canada and founded the E. B. Eddy Company, which produced matches, and related wood products, and later diversified into pulp and paper, growing to a major manufacturer. Eddy later became a politician, serving as mayor of Hull, Quebec and Quebec legislator.

Early life
Ezra Butler Eddy was born near Bristol, Vermont on August 22, 1827, the son of Samuel Eddy and Clarissa Eastman. His father was of Scottish ancestry. With respect to his religious connections, he was brought up a Baptist.

He was brought up on the farm until he was about ten and during some of that time he attended the district school. His father then moved from the farm into the village of Bristol and began hotel-keeping, and young Eddy became his assistant. While here he again had the privilege of attending school for four winters. Not caring for his mode of life, and having a strong inclination for general business, at the age of fifteen, Ezra left home and went to New York City, and here he procured a situation in a mercantile at three dollars a week, and on that sum had to board himself. He was, however, promoted in three months and received ten dollars per week, and he was soon entrusted with the banking business of the firm. After a year, not enjoying city life, he returned to Vermont, and commenced business for himself, by purchasing butter, cheese, etc., and taking the same to Boston and New York markets.

Manufacturing
Eddy first began manufacturing wooden matches by hand in Burlington, Vermont in 1851. In 1854, he brought his business to Hull, Canada East (now Gatineau, Quebec) when he was only twenty-four, where he began producing matches using discarded wood from the nearby sawmills. With the help of his first wife, E. B. Eddy produced his matches by hand at his home in Hull. His business grew rapidly, becoming one of the largest match factories in the world. In 1856 he added the manufacture of wooden ware, such as pails, tubs, washboards, clothes-pins, etc., to his business. In 1858 he commenced lumbering in a small way; but all these branches increased in volume from year to year, up to 1868, when the business had reached a magnitude of one million dollars per annum; and at the present time the yearly out-put is upwards of $1,500,000. In 1882 his entire premises were consumed by fire, and this entailed upon him a loss of $250,000, over and above insurance. With characteristic enterprise and courage, in the space of twelve months new premises were erected, and he was able to turn out nearly the same quantity of goods, as during former years.  By 1886, he had reorganized and established the E. B. Eddy Company. He set up a factory, acquired timber rights and built his sawmill. At the same time, he expanded into the pulp and paper business.

Mayor
For thirteen years, at different times he occupied the position of Mayor of Hull. He represented Ottawa electoral district in the Legislative Assembly of Quebec from 1871 to 1875. He was a member of the municipal council for Hull from 1878 to 1888 and mayor from 1881 to 1885, from 1887 to 1888 and from 1891 to 1892. He tabled the bill creating the City of Hull in 1875. Besides running his factories, he was an administrator of the Canada Central Railway Company.

1900 fire
After the great fire on April 26, 1900, Eddy was able to re-establish operation in less than a year in spite of the fact that he had suffered an estimated loss of 3 million dollars in the fire. In spite of the fires that repeatedly ravaged his factories and his house, Eddy persevered. He was an astute and canny industrialist whose success during this era of industrial capitalist expansion was due, in part, to his involvement in politics.

Personal life
He was highly esteemed, not only in Hull but throughout Canada. He founded the Eddy Lodge, A. F. & A. M. of the Grand Lodge of Quebec, and was also a Knight Templar. He was married twice, first in Bristol, Vermont, on December 29, 1884, to Zaida Diana Arnold, daughter of Uriah Fields Arnold and John Arnold, of Frankfort-on-the-Main, Germany. She bore him three children, two sons and one daughter. The boys, Rollin and Samuel, died in infancy, but his daughter, Ella Clarissa, survived him. She died in 1893. He wed his second wife, Jennie Grahl Shirreff, in Halifax on June 27, 1894. Upon his death, she became his principal heir.

Death
He died at Standish Hall, Hull, Quebec, on February 10, 1906, and his body was taken to Bristol, Vermont where he was buried at the Bristol Board Cemetery. Eddy's company was one of the major employers in the region for over a hundred years. The pulp and paper business is now a division of Domtar and Eddy Match Company is now a brand name of Atlas Matches of Euless, Texas.

In 1976, a plaque was dedicated to Ezra Butler Eddy in Hull, Quebec.

References

External links 
 
Biography at the Dictionary of Canadian Biography Online
L’Encyclopédie de l’histoire du Québec / The Quebec History Encyclopedia
Canadian Museum of Civilization

1827 births
1906 deaths
American emigrants to pre-Confederation Quebec
Pre-Confederation Canadian businesspeople
Conservative Party of Quebec MNAs
Mayors of Hull, Quebec
History of Gatineau
Papermakers
People from Bristol, Vermont
Persons of National Historic Significance (Canada)
Immigrants to the Province of Canada
Matches (firelighting)
Anglophone Quebec people
American people of English descent
Canadian people of English descent
American people of Scottish descent
Canadian people of Scottish descent